Rainbow of Hong Kong is a non-profit organisation advocating for LGBT rights in Hong Kong. It was founded on 1 December 1991 and registered as a charity in 2011.

History 
Rainbow of Hong Kong was originally based in Mong Kok, but after one year of operation it moved its headquarters due to financial problems. Until 2007, the organisation received funding from the AIDS Trust Fund Council in the suburb of Jordan, with much of the money going towards the development of Hong Kong's first social services centre for members of the LGBT community, which opened on 30 July 2007. The centre provides counselling, volunteer training, and LGBT awareness classes.

References

External links 
 

LGBT organisations in Hong Kong
LGBT political advocacy groups in Hong Kong
Non-profit organisations based in Hong Kong
Hong Kong voluntary organisations
Charities based in Hong Kong
1991 establishments in Hong Kong